Hala Tehsil (Sindhi: هالا تعلقو) is an administrative subdivision, (Tehsil), of Matiari District in the Sindh province of Pakistan. 
As of the 2017 census, Hala Taluka has a population of 262,423. The total population constitutes, 143,965 rural and 118,458
urban population. Hala City is the headquarter of this Tehsil. Important towns/villages of this taluka  include Hala old, Bhit Shah, Panj Moro, Khandu and Bhanoth.

Tehsil Hala comprises following six Union Councils:
 Bhanoth
 Bhitshah
 Hala - I
 Hala - II
 Hala Old
 Karam Khan Nizamani

References

Identified Mr. Noukhez Ali Memon From HANDS Matiari LSBE
Name of Government  High Schools in Taluks Hala
Makhdoom Ghulam Hyder Hala New
Government Boys High Schools II
Government Girls High Schools Hala New
Shaheed Mohammad Aslam Hala Old
Government Girls High Schools Hala Old
Government Boys High Schools Bhanoth
Government Girls High Schools Bhanoth
Government Boys High Schools Saeed Khan Leghari 
Government Boys High Schools Bhit Shah
Government Girls High Schools Bhit Shah
Government Boys High Schools Mansoorah 
Government Boys High Schools Karam khan Nizamani

Matiari District
Talukas of Sindh